Almost a Gentleman is a 1938 British comedy film directed by Oswald Mitchell and starring Billy Bennett, Kathleen Harrison, and Gibb McLaughlin. In January 1928, Bennett had appeared in a short film of the same title, made in the DeForest Phonofilm sound-on-film process.

Premise
A night watchman is mistaken for a wealthy financier.

Cast
 Billy Bennett - Bill Barker
 Kathleen Harrison - Mrs Barker
 Gibb McLaughlin - Bartholomew Quist
 Marcelle Rogez - Mimi
 Mervyn Johns - Percival Clicker
 Basil Langton - Andrew Sinker
 Harry Terry - Jim
 Dorothy Vernon - Mrs Garrett

References

External links

1938 films
British comedy films
1938 comedy films
British black-and-white films
Films directed by Oswald Mitchell
1930s English-language films
1930s British films